Bani Maslam is a sub-district located in Al Qafr District, Ibb Governorate, Yemen. Bani Maslam had a population of  12599 as of 2004.

References 

Sub-districts in Al Qafr District